Six Days, Seven Nights is a 1998 American action-adventure comedy film directed by Ivan Reitman and starring Harrison Ford and Anne Heche. The screenplay was written by Michael Browning. It was filmed on location in Kauai, and released on June 12, 1998. Despite mixed reviews, the film was a moderate box-office success.

Plot 
Robin Monroe is a New York editor for a fashion magazine called Dazzle. Her boyfriend Frank Martin surprises her with a week-long vacation in Makatea, an island in the South Pacific. The final leg of their journey to Makatea is in a vintage de Havilland Canada DHC-2 Beaver, piloted by a middle-aged American, Quinn Harris. They are accompanied by Quinn's young girlfriend Angelica. On their first night on the island, Frank proposes to Robin, who happily accepts. At a bar, a drunken Quinn, failing to recognize Robin, unsuccessfully hits on her.

The next morning, Robin's boss Marjorie wants her to briefly interrupt her vacation to fly to Tahiti to supervise a fashion shoot. She hires Quinn to fly her there. While en route, a sudden thunderstorm appears. The plane gets damaged by a lightning strike, forcing Quinn to crash-land on a deserted island, damaging the plane's wheel. Quinn believes they are on an island that has a signal beacon located on a high hill. If disabled, a repair crew will be sent. After climbing a high hill, they discover that in fact they are on a different island.

Back on Makatea, Frank and Angelica accompany the aerial search party for their missing partners, but after several days, the search is unsuccessful and is soon called off. Frank, believing Robin is dead, gets drunk and sleeps with Angelica after she seduces him.

After spotting a boat off the island coast, Robin and Quinn head out to it in the life raft. Discovering that there are now two vessels moored next to each other, then observing a man being killed and thrown into the water, they realize that the second vessel belongs to pirates. The pirates spot Quinn and Robin and pursue them back to the island. After briefly being captured, the two narrowly escape. While hiding in the jungle, they discover a crashed World War II Japanese float plane. They salvage the pontoons and attach them to Quinn's damaged plane in an attempt to leave the island. As they are about to take off, the pirates reappear and fire shells onto the beach, injuring Quinn. They start the plane and are able to take off. They fly over the pirates, who accidentally destroy their own boat whilst shooting at the plane.

Quinn quickly instructs Robin on how to land the plane before passing out due to his injury, leaving Robin to fly it herself. Arriving at Makatea, she lands the aircraft close to the beach, where their memorial service is in progress. Frank is relieved that Robin is alive, but secretly is disgusted with himself for having slept with Angelica. Robin visits Quinn in the hospital and confesses her feelings for him, but he says their lives are too different.

As Robin and Frank are about to fly back to New York, she says she does not want to get married. Frank confesses he slept with Angelica and she reveals her feelings for Quinn. They realize they are not in love and Robin returns Frank's engagement ring.

Quinn has a change of heart and rushes to the airport to find Robin, but is apparently too late. He then encounters Robin, who got off the plane before it took off and is surprised to see Quinn. Quinn confesses his feelings for her.

Cast 

 Harrison Ford as Quinn Harris
 Anne Heche as Robin Monroe
 David Schwimmer as Frank Martin
 Jacqueline Obradors as Angelica
 Temuera Morrison as Jager
 Allison Janney as Marjorie
 Douglas Weston as Philippe Sinclair
 Cliff Curtis as Kip
 Danny Trejo as Pierce
 Ben Bodé as Tom Marlowe
 Derek Basco as Ricky
 Amy Sedaris as Robin's secretary
 Kerry Rossall as Yacht Owner

Production 
The film was acquired by Caravan Pictures for Disney's Hollywood Pictures as a vehicle for Julia Roberts. Following Roberts' departure from the film, Anne Heche was cast.

The film features stunt work with aircraft. The effects were produced without CGI assistance. The crash scene of the de Havilland Beaver was performed with a Huey helicopter suspending the unmanned aircraft with a 200-foot cable with the engine running.

Harrison Ford is a certified pilot and did his own flying in the film, after fulfilling the insurance company's training requirements.

Reception

Critical response 
On review aggregation website Rotten Tomatoes, Six Days, Seven Nights holds an approval rating of 37% based on 41 reviews, with an average rating of 5.4/10. The site's critics consensus states: "A generally enjoyable, if completely forgettable piece of Hollywood fluff." 
At Metacritic, it has a weighted average score of 51 out of 100, based on 23 critics, indicating "mixed or average reviews". Roger Ebert of The Chicago Sun-Times gave the film two and a half stars out of a possible four. He wrote highly of Ford and Heche, saying he had "an easy appeal" and she exhibited "unforced charm", yet the film overall "seems cobbled together out of spare parts".

Audiences polled by CinemaScore gave the film an average grade of "B+" on an A+ to F scale.

Box office 
Six Days, Seven Nights grossed $74.3 million in the United States and Canada, and $90.5 million in other territories, for a worldwide total of $164.8 million.

In its opening weekend the film made $16.5 million and finished in second, then made $10.7 million and $7.7 million the following two weekends.

References

External links 
 
 
 
 
 

1998 films
1990s adventure comedy films
1998 romantic comedy films
American adventure comedy films
American romantic comedy films
American aviation films
Caravan Pictures films
Films directed by Ivan Reitman
Films set in French Polynesia
Touchstone Pictures films
Films shot in Hawaii
Films produced by Roger Birnbaum
Pirate films
Films scored by Randy Edelman
Films produced by Ivan Reitman
1990s English-language films
1990s American films